The Battle for Sanskrit: Is Sanskrit Political or Sacred, Oppressive or Liberating, Dead or Alive? is a 2016 book written by Rajiv Malhotra which criticizes the academic discipline of Indology, as practiced by Western scholars and particularly Sheldon Pollock.

Malhotra criticizes the hegemony of "Western" approaches in studying India esp. Sanskrit texts and frames a rebuttal from within the traditions of Tarka sastra. Lamenting the increasing hold of Western thoughtschools even among Indian indologists, historians, and journalists, he urges for the mainstreaming of "traditional indigenous" approaches. In a review, Bibek Debroy commended Malhotra for exhorting the need of alternative paradigms in Indology notwithstanding the polemics against Pollock.

The book found support in the Hindu Right; it was cited in a petition urging for the removal of Sheldon Pollock from the editorship of the Murty Classical Library of India.

Introduction 
Malhotra explains why he wrote this book. He notes the hegemony of western approaches in studying India, and asks for a study of this western approach from a traditional point of view. His book is an attempt to provide such a reversal. According to Malhotra, western Indology scholars are deliberately intervening in Indian societies by offering analyses of Sanskrit texts which would be rejected by "the traditional Indian experts." He also finds western scholars too prescriptive, that is, being "political activists" that want to prescribe a specific way of life.

The cover of the book is a picture of artwork featuring the British philologist William Jones (1746–1794) which Malhotra had seen displayed in Oxford, depicting Jones giving knowledge to Hindu pandits.

The inducement for this book was the prospect of Sringeri Peetham, the monastery founded by Adi Shankara in south India, collaborating with Columbia University to set up an "Adi Shankara Chair" for Hindu religion and philosophy, sponsored by an Indian donor. The instalment committee for the chair was to be headed by Sheldon Pollock, whom Malhotra regards as an erudite scholar but also as one who undermines the traditional understanding. Malhotra contacted the lead donor to voice his concerns, which were not shared by the donor. Nevertheless, Malhotra fears "the issue of potential conflict when the occupant of the chair takes positions that undermine the very tradition that has backed and funded the chair." According to Malhotra,

Chapter 1: The Hijacking of Sanskrit and Sanskriti 
According to Malhotra, Sanskrit forms the essence of Indian civilisation. Malhotra discerns an "insider" and an "outsider" approach to the study of Sanskrit texts based on the academic concept of Emic and etic. However Malhotra emphasizes his distinction between insiders and outsiders is not based on ethnicity, but the lens through which one looks at Sanskrit texts. Insiders view Sanskrit as sacred, but outsiders view the sacredness of Sanskrit as merely a smokescreen for oppressive views.

Chapter 2: From European Orientalism to American Orientalism 
Contemporary American scholars differ from their British counterparts, having greater access to Indian society and Indian collaborators. American Orientalism has a great impact. Malhotra describes the circumstances in which American Orientalism grew and how it differs from European Orientalism. According to Malhotra it is influenced by Marxism, using a liberation philology, which under the guise of empowering social groups such as dalits, women and Muslims pits them against each other and against Hinduism.

Malhotra gives special attention to Sheldon Pollock. According to Malhotra, Pollock is determined in "utterly purging Sanskrit studies of their sacred dimension." Malhotra singles out Pollock as being exemplary of this American Orientalism, since he is considered its foremost exponent, and Malhotra wants to realise a maximum impact with his criticism of American Orientalism.

Chapter 3: The Obsession with Secularizing Sanskrit 
According to Malhotra, Pollock separates the spiritual transcendent aspect of Sanskrit, paramarthika, from the mundane worldly aspect, vyavaharika. Pollock then dismisses the paramarthika as being irrational. Malhotra further states that Pollock is incorrect in portraying kāvya, a Sanskrit literary style used by Indian court poets, as fundamentally different from Vedic ideas.  He states that Pollock "secularises" the kāvya literature by removing its transcendental dimensions.

Reception 
Bibek Debroy in his review states that, 
 
According to Bibek Debroy, The Battle for Sanskrit follows the traditional Indian style mentioned in the Sanskrit tarka shastra tradition of reasoning. "You cite your opponent’s argument (purva paksha) and counter it with your own argument (uttara paksha)". Bibek Debroy writes, "Malhotra does the same with Pollock, setting out the Pollock arguments first and focusing particularly on Pollock’s views on the Valmiki Ramayana." According to Debroy, Malhotra agrees that there's no 'one true' approach in this, rather he wants the "home team" to be "energized". This book is best understood as an exhortation for that alternative paradigm. Bibek Debroy believes that even though the book has been labelled a ‘Battle for Sanskrit’, it is about our legacy and believes that "for people to be persuaded that this would be a terrible idea, this is a wonderful book that needs to be read and disseminated."

The book found support from writers who call to join this "battle," like Rajeev Srinivasan. It was also cited in a petition by the Hindu Right urging for the removal of Sheldon Pollock from the editorship of the Murty Classical Library of India.

See also 
 Sheldon Pollock
 Rajiv Malhotra
 Breaking India
 Invading the Sacred

References

Notes

Further reading 
 McComas Taylor, Tigers vs goats: Rajiv Malhotra’s battle for Sanskrit, Asian Currents, Asian Studies Assocciation of Australia, 14 August 2015.

Sanskrit
2016 non-fiction books
HarperCollins books
Hinduism studies books
Indian non-fiction books
Philosophy books
21st-century Indian books
Hinduism-related controversies